Steroidobacter flavus is a microcystin-degrading bacterium from the genus of Steroidobacter which has been isolated from forest soil from the Hainan Island in China.

References

Gammaproteobacteria